Restoule Provincial Park is a provincial park in Parry Sound District in Central Ontario, Canada. It is located between Restoule Lake and Stormy Lake and extends along the banks of the Restoule River to its mouth at the French River (excluding the banks belonging to the Dokis First Nation) in geographic Patterson Township and geographic Hardy Township. The park is located at the western terminus of Highway 534 northwest of Restoule, Ontario. The park offers three hiking trails and is home to coyotes, wolves, bears, otters, pine martens, moose and one of Ontario's largest white-tailed deer herds. It is also home to over 90 species of birds including the peregrine falcon and the heron. Camping areas include Bells Point, Putts Point and Kettle Point. Many hike the well-marked trail to the  fire tower overlooking Stormy Lake. It is one of two provincial parks found in the Almaguin Highlands.

References

External links
 

Provincial parks of Ontario
Parks in Parry Sound District
Protected areas established in 1990
1990 establishments in Ontario